The University of Otago, Wellington is one of seven component schools that make up the University of Otago Division of Health Sciences. All University of Otago medical students who gain entry after a competitive Health Sciences First Year programme, or who gain graduate entry, spend their second and third years studying in Dunedin in a programme called Early Learning in Medicine (ELM), which is jointly taught by the Otago Medical School and the School of Biomedical Sciences. In their fourth, fifth, and sixth years, medical students study at either Otago Medical School; the University of Otago, Christchurch; or the University of Otago, Wellington.

History
From 1924, students could complete their last year of training at hospitals in either Auckland, Christchurch, or Wellington as well as Dunedin. In 1938, a branch faculty was established in Christchurch, Auckland, and Wellington. The Wellington branch faculty became a 'clinical' school in 1977, the forerunner to the modern University of Otago, Wellington.

In 2021 the 1970s campus building in Newtown, adjacent to Wellington Regional Hospital, was closed due to earthquake concerns, requiring the staff to work from home or at other locations.

Departments
The University of Otago, Wellington is structured into nine academic departments:
 Medicine
 Obstetrics, Gynaecology and Women's Health
 Paediatrics
 Pathology and Molecular Medicine
 Primary Health Care and General Practice
 Psychological Medicine
 Public Health
 Radiation Therapy
 Surgery and Anaesthesia.
Additional disciplines are taught in Dunedin and Christchurch.

The Wellington Medical and Health Sciences Library provides library services to staff and students of the University and staff of the Capital and Coast District Health Board.

Notable academics and staff 

 Michael Baker
Dawn Elder
Keri Lawson-Te Aho
Tom O'Donnell (physician)
Ian Prior (epidemiologist)
Sue Pullon
Lynette Sadleir
Diana Sarfati
Dianne Sika–Paotonu

References

External links
 University of Otago Medical School
 University of Otago, Wellington
 University of Otago Health Sciences First Year

O, University of Otago, Wellington
University of Otago